= Yelimunnoli =

Village in Belagavi, Karnataka

- Location within Karnataka Location within India
- Coordinates: 16°16′10″N 74°34′47″E
- Country: India
- State: Karnataka
- District: Belagavi district

Yelimunnoli is a village in Belagavi district in the Indian state of Karnataka. It is a Zilla Panchayat constituency.

== Geography ==
It is 4 km from Hukkeri and 54 km north of Belgaum. The nearest river is Hiranyakesi.

== Transport ==
The nearest airport is Belgaum, 54 km away. The nearest railway stations are Ghataprabha (20 km), Belgaum (54 km), Ghat prabha (22 km),

== Places to visit ==
Nearby picnic spots include Gokak falls, Hidkal Dam and Gudachana Malaki falls.
